was a Japanese chemist.

References

Japanese chemists
1937 births
2006 deaths